Belidzhi (Belici) is an urban locality (an urban-type settlement) in Derbentsky District of the Republic of Dagestan, Russia. As of the 2010 Census, its population was 12,236.

History
It was established in 1899. Urban-type settlement status was granted to it in 1965.

Administrative and municipal status
Within the framework of administrative divisions, the urban-type settlement of Belidzhi is incorporated within Derbentsky District as Belidzhi Settlement (an administrative division of the district). As a municipal division, Belidzhi Settlement is incorporated within Derbentsky Municipal District as Belidzhi Urban Settlement.

References

Notes

Sources

Urban-type settlements in the Republic of Dagestan